Rottenbach is a small river of Thuringia, Germany. It joins the Ilm in Ilmenau.

See also
List of rivers of Thuringia

Rivers of Thuringia
Rivers of Germany